Sam Smith (born 1992) is an English singer and songwriter.

Sam Smith may also refer to:

Arts
Sam Smith (actor) (born 1989), English child actor
Sam Smith (Australian actor), known for Jirga (2018)
Sam Smith (artist), Australian artist
Sam Smith (painter) (1918–1999), American painter
Sam Smith (toymaker) (1908–1983), artist, sculptor and toymaker
Samuel Smith (photographer) (1802-1892), English photographer

Media and politics
Sam Smith (journalist) (born 1937), American journalist and activist
Sam Smith (sportswriter) (born 1948), American sports journalist for the Chicago Tribune
Sam Smith (American politician) (1922–1995), state legislator from Washington
Sam Smith (Australian politician), Australian union official and politician
Sam Smith (born 1988), reality television personality known for his appearance on the 21st season of Big Brother

Sports

Association football
Sam Smith (footballer, born 1904) (1904–1988), English footballer with Cardiff City and Port Vale
Sam Smith (footballer, born 1909) (1909–1994), English footballer with Birmingham, Norwich City and Walsall
Sam Smith (footballer, born 1998), English footballer for Cambridge United

Other sports
Sam Smith (basketball, born 1943) (1943–2022), American basketball player in the ABA
Sam Smith (basketball, born 1955), American basketball player in the NBA
Sam Smith (rugby league), British rugby league footballer
Sam Smith (rugby union) (born 1990), English rugby union player
Sam Smith (tennis) (born 1971), British tennis player

Other fields 
 Sam Smith (psychologist) (1929–2012), Canadian academic
 Sam Smith (businesswoman) (born 1974), British CEO of FinnCap

See also
Samuel Smith Old Brewery, commonly known as Sam Smith's, a brewer in England 
Samuel Smith (disambiguation)
Samantha Smith (disambiguation)
Sam Roberts-Smith (born 1985), Australian operatic baritone